Wamanripayuq (Quechua wamanripa Senecio, -yuq a suffix, "the one with the wamanripa", Hispanicized spelling Huamanripayoc) is a  mountain in the Andes of Peru. It is located in the Huánuco Region, Ambo Province, San Rafael District, and in the Pachitea Province, Panao District.

References

Mountains of Peru
Mountains of Huánuco Region